Barent Avercamp (1612 – October 1679) was a Dutch painter. 

Avercamp was born in Kampen and was taught by his uncle Hendrick Avercamp, who was also a painter. Barent primarily painted scenes depicting Netherlands in winter. He was a member of the Guild of Saint Luke, and traveled around the Netherlands including Zwolle and Zutphen for his settings and inspiration.

References

1612 births
1679 deaths
Dutch Golden Age painters
Dutch male painters
People from Kampen, Overijssel